The Barrier is a 1937 adventure film directed by Lesley Selander. The story was previously filmed by MGM as a silent in 1926.

Plot
In 1890, in Flambeau, a small mining town in Alaska near the Canadian border, among the inhabitants are the prospectors John Gale and "No Creek" Lee and the French fur hunter Poleon Doret. Gale, a man with a big heart, lives with an Indian woman, Alluna, and a girl, Necia, whom he treats like a daughter. In reality, Necia is the daughter of another Indian, Merridy, loved by Gale some time before, but who had married another. Bennett, her husband, had turned out to be a violent man and Merridy, trying to save her daughter from her abuse, had asked for help from Gale who had promised her to watch over the baby until she joined them after leaving her husband. But Merridy had never arrived and Gale had been charged with kidnapping the girl and murdering Merridy. Having escaped capture, Gale had gone into hiding, taking refuge in Flambeau. When the troops of the United States arrive in the city and, under the leadership of Lieutenant Burrell, create a fixed position of the army, Flambeau is all in fibrillation. Among the newcomers is also Bennett who now uses the name of Stark. The man, for fifteen years, has been on the trail of Gale and now he intends to have him arrested and to take Necia from him. Poleon, the French, who grew up with the girl, fell in love with her, but Necia prefers the lieutenant. Alluna, however, warns her that a white man will never marry a half-breed like her. Necia, after talking to Burrell who tells her that their separation would be the best thing for her, leaves with a broken heart. Gale decides to tell the lieutenant everything to ensure a future for Necia. Stark orders Burrell to arrest him, but he must confront the miner. From the clash, the two opponents both come out injured. At the end of his life, Stark says he has taken Necia. Poleon, who hears it, runs to the river to save the girl, arriving just in time. Burrell, meanwhile, obtains Stark's confession about Merridy's murder, thus exonerating Gale who is also found not guilty by the miners' committee for Stark's death. Poleon gallantly gives Necia to Burrell and leaves Flambeau in a canoe singing a song. [1]

Cast
Leo Carrillo as Poleon Doret
Jean Parker as Necia Gale
James Ellison as Lieutenant Burrell
Otto Kruger as Stark
J.M. Kerrigan as Sergeant Thomas
Robert Barrat as John Gale
Andy Clyde as 'No-Creek' Lee
Sally Martin as Molly Gale
Sara Haden as Mrs. John 'Alluna' Gale
Addison Richards as Henchman Runnion
Alan Davis as Sergeant Tobin
Fernando Alvarado as Johnny Gale

External links

1937 films
1937 adventure films
Films directed by Lesley Selander
American black-and-white films
American adventure films
Films based on works by Rex Beach
Remakes of American films
Sound film remakes of silent films
1930s English-language films
1930s American films